The Alfa Romeo 12C or Tipo C was a 12-cylinder Grand Prix car. The 12C-36 made its debut in Tripoli Grand Prix 1936, and the 12C-37 in Coppa Acerbo 1937. The 12C-36 was a Tipo C fitted with the new V12 instead of the 3.8 litre straight-eight of the 8C-35. The 12C-37 was a new car, with a lower chassis and an engine bored and stroked
to 4475 cc, now with roller- instead of plain bearings and two smaller superchargers instead of a single large one. The car suffered poor handling, which could not be cured in time for the 1937 Italian GP, and thus was not successful. This is given as the reason for Vittorio Jano's resignation from Alfa Romeo at the end of 1937. The 12C-36 used the existing six Tipo C chassis. Four examples of the 12C-37 were built, although only two were actually assembled for the 1937 Coppa Acerbo and Italian GP. Early in 1938, the Tipo C (8C-35, 12C-36) chassis were modified into 308s, with the straight-eight engine fitted lower in the chassis and a completely new body. The four 12C-37 chassis were instead assembled into 312 (V12 downsized to 3-litre) and 316 (V16 obtained from two 158 engines fitted to a common crankcase) formula race cars.

Main victories 
1936 Penya Rhin Grand Prix, Tazio Nuvolari
1936 Milan Grand Prix, Tazio Nuvolari
1936 Modena Grand Prix, Tazio Nuvolari
1936 Vanderbilt Cup,  Tazio Nuvolari
1937 Milan Grand Prix, Tazio Nuvolari
1937 Valentino Grand Prix,  Antonio Brivio
1937 Circuito di Napoli, Giuseppe Farina
1937 Genova Grand Prix, Carlo Felice Trossi

*All with 12C-36

References

12C
Grand Prix cars